Ernie Tout (11 August 1874 – 15 June 1966) was an Australian rules footballer who played with Melbourne in the Victorian Football League (VFL).

Notes

External links 

		

1874 births
1966 deaths
Australian rules footballers from Melbourne
Melbourne Football Club players
People from Collingwood, Victoria